Marko Živković (Serbian Cyrillic: Марко Живковић; born 17 May 1994) is a Serbian professional footballer who plays as a right-back for Partizan.

Career
After coming through the youth academy of Partizan, Živković made his senior debut with their affiliated side Teleoptik. He was promoted back to Partizan in the winter of 2013, penning a four-year deal. On 22 May 2013, Živković made his competitive debut for the club in a 2–0 away win against Smederevo. He made two league appearances in the 2012–13 season, as the club won the national championship title. On 24 January 2014, Živković signed a contract with Vojvodina until the summer of 2016. He was a member of the team that won the 2013–14 Serbian Cup.

Honours
Partizan
 Serbian SuperLiga: 2012–13

Vojvodina
 Serbian Cup: 2013–14

References

External links
 

1994 births
Living people
Sportspeople from Smederevo
Serbian footballers
Serbian expatriate footballers
Serbia youth international footballers
Association football defenders
FC DAC 1904 Dunajská Streda players
FK Partizan players
FK Sūduva Marijampolė players
FK Teleoptik players
FK Vojvodina players
FK Voždovac players
FK Radnički Niš players
Serbian SuperLiga players
A Lyga players
Slovak Super Liga players
Expatriate footballers in Lithuania
Expatriate footballers in Slovakia
Serbian expatriate sportspeople in Lithuania
Serbian expatriate sportspeople in Slovakia